Bluebell Records was an Italian independent record label active from 1959 to 1969 as part, along with other labels such as Mini Rec and Belldisc, of the Belldisc S.p.A. group. In 1969 these labels were fused into a new one, which became known as Produttori Associati.

The label released records by several artists, such as Fabrizio De André, Carmen Villani, The New Dada, Rocco Granata, Maurizio Arcieri and Duilio Del Prete. For many years, the label's head of publicity was Germano Ruscitto, who went on to become director of the music magazine Discografia Internazionale.

Catalog
There is a chronological incongruence in the numbering of the 33 rpm catalog: after Fabrizio De André's Vol. 1° (BBLP 39) the numbering starts back from BBLP 30 (De André's following album, Tutti morimmo a stento, is numbered BBLP 32).

As for the 45 rpm catalog, two singles by The New Dada were published with the same catalog number (BB 03151) due to the label's decision to "promote" the single's B-side to the A-side of a new single, with a new B-side and different artwork, but the same catalog number.

33 rpm

45 rpm

45 rpm - Mini Rec label

33 rpm - OFF series

45 rpm - OFF series

Notes

Italian independent record labels
Record labels established in 1959
Record labels disestablished in 1969